Ptilophora plumigera, the plumed prominent, is a moth of the family Notodontidae. The species was first described by Michael Denis and Ignaz Schiffermüller in 1775. It is found in the southern parts of the Palearctic realm.

The wingspan is 33–44 mm. The moth flies from October to November depending on the location.

The larvae feed on maple.

External links

Fauna Europaea
Lepidoptera of Belgium
Lepiforum e.V.
De Vlinderstichting 

Notodontidae
Moths of Europe
Taxa named by Michael Denis
Taxa named by Ignaz Schiffermüller
Palearctic Lepidoptera